The ABSC African Snooker Championship is an annual snooker competition and is the highest ranking and most prestigious amateur event in Africa. The event series is sanctioned by the African Billiards & Snooker Confederation. Having been established back in 1993, the winner of the event often becomes the African nomination for the World Snooker Tour. Throughout the tournament’s early history the championship was dominated by South African players, however at the turn of the millennium Egyptian players became the dominant force in the championship, winning 11 of 15 championships since the year 2000.

The championship is currently held by Mohamed Ibrahim who defeated Hesham Shawky 5–4 in the final of the 2022 All-Africa Snooker & 6-Red Championship.

Winners

Stats

Champions by country

See also
 World Snooker Tour

References

Snooker amateur competitions
Recurring sporting events established in 1993
Snooker in Africa
Snooker